Chambers (or Chambres) was a ship launched in the Thirteen Colonies in 1781, possibly under another name. She was taken in prize in 1783. Chambers first appeared in Lloyd's Register in 1783. She traded between Liverpool and Africa, but is not listed as a slave ship. She foundered in 1792.

Career
Th Vice admiralty court in New York City condemned Chambres on 10 March 1783.

Loss
In early 1792  was on her way back to Bristol from Jamaica having taken on board the crew of Chambers, of Liverpool, which had been foundering.

The Liverpool Registry on 19 November 1792 marked her as having been lost.

Citations

References
 

1781 ships
Captured ships
Age of Sail merchant ships of England
Maritime incidents in 1792